Davis Hall may refer to:
 Davis Memorial Hall, building on Washington & Jefferson campus
 Barbara and Jack Davis Hall, building on the university at Buffalo campus

Architectural disambiguation pages